Lashkar-e-Islam, (LI or LeI) literally Army of Islam also transliterated as Lashkar-e-Islami, Lashkar-i-Islam) is a militant terrorist organization active in and around Khyber Agency, Federally Administered Tribal Areas, Pakistan.  LeI was founded in 2004 by Mufti Munir Shakir.  The most recent leader was Mangal Bagh. On 12 March 2015, Lashkar-e-Islam announced that it was joining Tehrik-i-Taliban Pakistan. Pakistan banned the organization in June 2008.

History
On 17 April 2008, Bagh claimed that LeI has over 180,000 volunteers in Khyber Agency.

On 27 April 2008, it was reported that a "Lashkar-e-Islam" has changed its name to "Jaish-e-Islami".  It is unclear whether this is the same group, or another which happened to use the same name.  The reports stated that this LeI is located in Bajaur Agency, and at the time was headed by Wali Rehman.
In October, a key commander of the militant group surrendered to security forces along with 80 of his men.
During Operation Khyber-1 numerous militants had laid down their arms and surrendered to authorities.
On 10 November 2014,  Official sources said that three key commanders of the group, newly appointed spokesman of the LI Saifullah Saif, Commander Ilyas and Commander Wajid, have announced that they were leaving the LI and have surrendered to authorities.

Currently, Lashkar-e-Islam has its headquarters in Afghanistan. Senior Afghan analyst, Borhan Osman, said that the Afghanistan government support to Lashkar-e-Islam is an open secret. There are currently 500 members of Lashkar-e-Islam in Afghanistan. Residents of Achin District in Afghanistan report that the Afghan government is generously hosting Lashkar-e-Islam members. The members of groups are allowed to host their group's flag on their houses. Similarly, along with militants from groups like Tehrik-i-Taliban, members of Lashkar-e-Islam are also allowed freedom of movement in the province and treatment on government run hospitals in Afghanistan. Afghan intelligence agency, National Directorate of Security (NDS) wants them to fight against the Pakistani government.

Leadership progression
2004: founded by Mufti Munir Shakir
2006: reportedly led by Haji Taj Mohammed, "member of the Afridi Shura."  However, a report from earlier that month refers to Taj as only "a spokesman for the Mufti"
2015: led by Mangal Bagh

Major attacks 
On 17 March 2016 Lashkar-e-Islam claimed responsibility for a bomb blast on a bus taking government employees from remote villages to Peshawar Secretariat. The attack claimed 16 lives and left 53 injured.

Recent focus on Lashkar-e-Islam
In 2022, LeI sent death threats to Kashmiri pandits in Indian-administered Jammu and Kashmir.
In 2008, LeI sends threatening letters to industrialists in Khyber Agency
In 2007, LeI clashes with Pakistani government troops in Khyber Agency

See also 
 List of Deobandi organisations

References

Terrorism in Pakistan
Jihadist groups in Pakistan
2004 establishments in Pakistan
Organizations established in 2004
Deobandi organisations